Biswanath Chowdhury is a Revolutionary Socialist Party politician, and a MLA from Balurghat for eight times. He was the West Bengal minister for Jails and Social Welfare for quarter of a century.

Seven-time MLA
Biswanath Chowdhury, a graduate from Balurghat College, first became a MLA in 1977. Thereafter, he continued as MLA in 1982,  1987, 1991, 1996, 2001 and 2006. In the 2011 elections he lost to Sankar Chakraborty of All India Trinamool Congress.

Minister for 25 years
Biswanath Chowdhury was minister for Jails and Social Welfare in West Bengal for 25 years from 1986 to 2011.

References

Living people
Revolutionary Socialist Party (India) politicians
West Bengal MLAs 1977–1982
West Bengal MLAs 1982–1987
West Bengal MLAs 1987–1991
West Bengal MLAs 1991–1996
West Bengal MLAs 1996–2001
West Bengal MLAs 2001–2006
West Bengal MLAs 2006–2011
West Bengal MLAs 2016–2021
People from Balurghat
State cabinet ministers of West Bengal
1942 births